The Italian Ice Sports Federation (FISG), is the governing body for ice sports in Italy. It was founded in September 1926 to promote the practice of winter sports on ice and to coordinate events. The FISG is a member of a number of international sports organizations including the International Ice Hockey Federation (IIHF) and the International Skating Union (ISU). The headquarter is in Milan.

History
The first Italian Ice Sports Federation was established in September 1926 in Milan by the fusion of three pre-existing federations, those for bobsledding, ice skating and ice hockey. In 1933 the FISG combined with the Italian skiing federation to create the Federazione Italiana Sport Invernali (FISI) (Italian Federation for Winter Sports ), with its operations transferred to Rome.

After World War II, when Italian sports organizations were being recreated, ice hockey and skiing were separate from ice skating.  In 1952 ice hockey again joined with ice skating creating the new Federazione Italiana Sport del Ghiaccio.

Sports
The FISG has authority over the following sports:
 Curling and wheelchair curling
 Ice hockey and para ice hockey
 Speed skating
 Figure skating
 Short track speed skating
 Ice stock sport

Federation presidents
List of presidents

Notable people
 Georges Larivière, technical director of the Italian Ice Sports Federation
 Lou Vairo, technical coordinator of ice hockey and coach of the Italy men's national ice hockey team

References

External links
  

Italy
Italy
International Ice Hockey Federation members
Italy
ice sports
Sports organizations established in 1952
1926 establishments in Italy